
Mikołów County is a unit of territorial administration and local government (powiat) in Silesian Voivodeship, southern Poland. It came into being on January 1, 1999, as a result of the Polish local government reforms passed in 1998.

As of 2019 its total population is 98,689, out of which the population of Mikołów is 40,898, that of Łaziska Górne is 22,298, that of Orzesze is 21,043, and the rural population is 14,450.

Neighbouring counties
Mikołów County is bordered by the city of Ruda Śląska to the north, Katowice and Tychy to the east, Pszczyna County and Żory to the south, Rybnik County to the west and Gliwice County to the north-west.

Administrative division

The county is subdivided into five gminas (three urban and two rural). These are listed in the following table, in descending order of population.

References

 
Land counties of Silesian Voivodeship